The 2010 Gatorade Duels were two  qualifying races for the 2010 Daytona 500 held on February 11, 2010 at the  Daytona International Speedway in Daytona Beach, Florida. The races determined the field for the race on Sunday, February 14, 2010. Prior to the Duels, only two drivers had their starting positions locked into the 500, they were pole-sitter Mark Martin and Dale Earnhardt Jr.  Bill Elliott, Joe Nemechek, Scott Speed, and Bobby Labonte were the four fastest non-top 35 drivers, thus locked in.

Race 1 and 2 results

Made the field

Did not qualify

Transfer Spots
In each duel, the two highest-finishing drivers not in the top 35 of the previous year's owners points earned a place in the Daytona 500.  In the second race, Scott Speed earned a place in addition to being one of the four fastest non top 35 drivers.  Therefore, an extra place opened for the fifth fastest qualifier and thus Michael Waltrip was awarded a spot in the race.

External links
Starting grid for the Gatorade Duels-Scene Daily

2010 in sports in Florida
2010 NASCAR Sprint Cup Series
NASCAR races at Daytona International Speedway
February 2010 sports events in the United States